Edward Digges (14 February 1620 – 15 March 1674/75) was an English barrister and colonist who served as Colonial Governor of Virginia from March 1655 to December 1656, and on the Virginia colony's Governor's Advisory Council from 1664 until his death (except when in England both handling personal business and representing the colony before the Virginia Company of London and the royal government. The son of the English politician Dudley Digges, also was a planter who exported premium tobacco as well as invested heavily in planting mulberry trees and promoting the silk industry in the colony. He also served as appointed auditor-general and later receiver-general of the Virginia colony.

Early life
Born in Chilham Castle, Kent, England,and christened in Chilham parish on 29 March 1620, Edward Digges was the fourth son of Sir Dudley Digges (1583–1638) and his wife Mary Kempe (1583–?). Sir Dudley was the Master of the Rolls for King Charles I and an investor in the Virginia Company of London.
 
Edward Digges entered Gray's Inn in 1637 to become a barrister.

Career

Digges emigrated to the Virginia Colony about 1650 and purchased from Captain John West a plantation of 1250 acres in present-day York County, Virginia, near Yorktown.  About 1653, he laid out Fort Mattapony near Walkerton, King and Queen County, Virginia.

Tobacco planter
Edward Digges was more successful with tobacco than with silk.  He became known for growing "E.D." tobacco, a sweet-scented variety which brought an unusually high price in London.

Experiments in silk production

Digges developed a strong interest in reviving the production of silk in Virginia.  The cultivation of the silkworm had been attempted previously in the colony, in response to King James's interest in the subject.  However, these early efforts had been unsuccessful, perhaps due to lack of enthusiasm among the colonists.  Digges, in contrast, became deeply absorbed in his project.  He brought over two Armenians(which are considered to be the first armenians in america) to help him experiment with silk production, and even wrote a pamphlet entitled "The Reformed Virginia Silkworm", in which he claimed that "native silkworms could be kept outdoors on native mulberry trees and that Indians could be employed to care for the worms."

Digges sent a parcel of his silk to the Royal Society, by way of his cousin Dudley Palmer, one of the original Fellows of the Society.  In the letter accompanying the silk sample, Digges comments on his findings, for example:

Digges's efforts to create a silk industry in Virginia proved futile.  By 1656 the Virginia Assembly had become disillusioned with silkworms, and passed the following terse act to signal its loss of enthusiasm:

To this day there are numerous mulberry trees, which were used to raise the silk worms, still standing on the land of the old plantation. In recognition of his efforts, Edward Digges was given a seat in the council in November 1654, "having given a signal testimony of his fidelity to this colony and commonwealth of England."

Politician

Digges served as Colonial Governor of Virginia from 30 March 1655 to December 1656, for which he received a salary of 25,000 pounds of tobacco, with the duties levied on vessels, and marriage license fees. In December 1656, upon hearing that Digges planned to sail for England to take care of family business, the House of Burgesses selected Samuel Mathews as governor to replace Edward Digges. The General Assembly also appointed Digges as the colonial agent to England. In this position, Digges was to go to England and meet with English merchants about the price of tobacco and to secure the rights of the colony. Leaving in March 1657, he took a letter from the House of Burgesses to Oliver Cromwell, who had been ruling England since 1653, following the English Civil War, to settle the long pending controversy between the Colony and Lord Baltimore.

Marriage and family

Edward Digges married Elizabeth Page, daughter of Francis Page (1595-1678), who bore thirteen children (of whom five survived their parents) and survived her husband by more than a decade. The daughter of a burgess and sister of Col. John Page of Middle Plantation, she had been raised at "Bedfont" plantation in  Middlesex County.

The six Digges children who survived to adulthood:
William (– 24 July 1697) served in the House of Burgesses as well as in local offices. He married Elizabeth Wharton, step-daughter of Lord Baltimore, and had ten children.
Dudley (1664 – 18 Jan 1710) served on the Virginia Governor's Council. He married Susannah Cole (1674 - 1708 and produced four children:
Cole (1692–1774); he married Elizabeth Foliott Power: One of his sons Cole also served on the Virginia Governor's Council. His third son Dudley (c. 1728 – 1790) served in the House of Burgesses from 1752 until the Revolutionary War. Dudley Digges was a member of the Committee of Safety established by the Virginia Conventions to act in the absence of the royal governor, he would become a lieutenant governor of Virginia and was one of the members of the Virginia Assembly captured by the British in a Charlottesville raid in 1781.
Mary (– 1690/91); she married her first cousin Francis Page, and had a daughter Elizabeth, who in turn married a first cousin (John Page) and died in 1702, aged 19, leaving two children (John and Elizabeth), both of whom died without issue.
Anne (– 1686); she married William Cole and had two sons, both of whom died in childhood.
Edward; he shared in the 1692 division of his mother's estate, but died unmarried and without issue.
Catherine (1654–1729); she lived in New Kent, Virginia, and married three times. She produced 3 sons (Edward, James, and William Herndon).

Death and legacy

Digges died in 1675.  A large tombstone was placed over his grave near his home at Bellfield, with the following inscription:

Digges' will (dated 28 August 1669, proved 16 June 1675) left legacies "to all my children being four boys and four girls", thus establishing that by 1669, when the will was written, only eight of the thirteen children mentioned in the grave inscription were still living.

Following Bacon's Rebellion, Mrs Digges was referred to in the Report of the Royal Commissioners as one of those who had suffered as a result of family loyalty to the King:

Elizabeth died intestate in 1691. An article published in the William and Mary Quarterly in 1893 recounts the division of her personal estate between her surviving heirs:

Mrs Digges' personal property was divided by the Court, in accordance with the law, among her four surviving heirs: three sons (William, Dudley, and Edward) and one granddaughter (Elizabeth Page, daughter of Mary Digges and Francis Page).

The plantation which Digges had purchased from Capt. John West (known as the E. D. plantation) remained in the family until 1787, when it was sold.  It was known as "Bellfield" by 1811, when it was advertised for sale as "Belfield, 1.000 acres in York Co., the only estate where the famous E.D. tobacco was raised, which never failed to bring in England one shilling when other tobacco would not bring three pence." It is currently under federal control as part of the Naval Weapons Station Yorktown.

See also
 Virginia

References

External links
 Biography at Encyclopedia Virginia

1620 births
1674 deaths
Silk production
Colonial governors of Virginia
Members of Gray's Inn
Independent scientists